The men's ISSF 50 meter pistol was a shooting sports event held as part of the Shooting at the 1952 Summer Olympics programme. It was the eighth appearance of the event. The competition was held on 25 July 1952 at the shooting ranges in Helsinki. 48 shooters from 28 nations competed. The maximum number of shooters per nation was reduced to 2, from 3 in previous Games. The event was won by Huelet Benner of the United States, the nation's first victory in the event since 1920 (and fourth overall, most of any nation). Silver went to Ángel León Gozalo of Spain and bronze to Ambrus Balogh of Hungary; they were the first medals in the free pistol for both nations.

Background

This was the eighth appearance of the ISSF 50 meter pistol event. The event was held at every Summer Olympics from 1896 to 1920 (except 1904, when no shooting events were held) and from 1936 to 2016; it was nominally open to women from 1968 to 1980, although very few women participated these years. A separate women's event would be introduced in 1984. 1896 and 1908 were the only Games in which the distance was not 50 metres; the former used 30 metres and the latter 50 yards.

Five of the top 10 shooters from the 1948 Games returned: bronze medalist (and 1936 gold medalist) Torsten Ullman of Sweden, fourth-place finisher Huelet Benner of the United States, fifth-place finisher Beat Rhyner of Switzerland, sixth-place finisher Ángel León Gozalo of Spain, and seventh-place finisher Ambrus Balogh of Hungary. Ullman was again the world champion in 1952, two weeks before the Games, his fifth time (1933, 1935, 1937, and 1947). Benner finished third at the world championships.

Bulgaria, Egypt, Guatemala, Mexico, the Soviet Union, Venezuela, and Yugoslavia each made their debut in the event. Greece and the United States each made their seventh appearance, tied for most of any nation.

Benner used a Hämmerli 100.

Competition format

The competition had each shooter fire 60 shots, in 6 series of 10 shots each, at a distance of 50 metres. The target was round, 50 centimetres in diameter, with 10 scoring rings. Scoring for each shot was up to 10 points, in increments of 1 point. The maximum score possible was 600 points. Any pistol was permitted.

Records

Prior to this competition, the existing world and Olympic records were as follows.

No new world or Olympic records were set during the competition.

Schedule

Results

References

Shooting at the 1952 Summer Olympics
Men's 1952